Ibai Gómez Pérez (born 11 November 1989) is a Spanish former professional footballer who played mainly as a left winger.

He achieved La Liga totals of 226 games and 28 goals over 11 seasons, with Athletic Bilbao (two spells) and Alavés. He won the 2020–21 Supercopa de España with the first club.

Club career

Early years
Born in Bilbao, Biscay, Gómez began his career with Santutxu FC in the Basque regional leagues, winning the Golden Ball for the category in February 2009. After five years with the club he left, but stayed in the region after agreeing on a move to Segunda División B's Sestao River Club.

Athletic Bilbao
On 4 June 2010, after Sestao's relegation, Gómez moved straight into La Liga, joining Athletic Bilbao for two years with an option for a further one or two. He spent most of his first season with the reserves in the third tier.

On 17 October 2010, Gómez made his top-flight debut, coming on as a substitute for Gaizka Toquero in the 67th minute of a home match against Real Zaragoza (2–1 win); after only three minutes, however, he himself had to be replaced, being stretchered off after suffering a knee injury.

Gómez contributed two goals as Athletic reached the final of the 2011–12 UEFA Europa League – totalling seven appearances in the competition – scoring against FC Schalke 04 (2–2 home draw, 6–4 on aggregate) and Sporting CP (3–1 home victory, 4–3 aggregate win). He was definitely promoted to the first team for 2012–13, being given the number 11 jersey. On 17 November 2012, he scored his first league goal of the campaign, in a 5–1 defeat at Real Madrid.

In 2013–14, Gómez scored eight goals from only 18 appearances, helping the Lions finish fourth and qualify for the UEFA Champions League. He also dealt with some injury problems during that season, and missed the vast majority of 2015–16 due to a tendinitis ailment to his right knee.

Alavés
On 31 July 2016, Gómez terminated his contract with Athletic and signed a three-year deal with fellow league team Deportivo Alavés just hours later. On 10 September he scored his first goal for the newly-promoted club, closing a 2–1 historic win against FC Barcelona at the Camp Nou. He also started in the final of the Copa del Rey against the same opponent, which ended in a 3–1 loss.

Gómez scored his first hat-trick as a professional on 4 December 2017, helping the visitors to a 3–2 away defeat of Girona FC after they trailed 2–0 with 20 minutes left.

Return to Athletic
On 10 January 2019, Gómez rejoined Athletic Bilbao on a contract until June 2022. He made his second debut for the club three days later, coming off the bench in a 2–0 home league victory over Sevilla FC.

Gómez second spell at the San Mamés Stadium was again greatly undermined by physical problems.

Later career
Goméz moved abroad for the first time in his career in March 2022, with the 32-year-old signing with Foolad F.C. in the Persian Gulf Pro League. With his new team, he made four appearances in the AFC Champions League.

On 27 July 2022, Gómez returned to his homeland on a one-year contract at Primera Federación side Deportivo de La Coruña, with the option of a one-year extension.

Style of play
Gómez was known for his crossing ability and powerful shot. Additionally, he was a set piece specialist with above-average dribbling skills.

Career statistics

Club

Honours
Athletic Bilbao
Supercopa de España: 2020–21
Copa del Rey runner-up: 2011–12, 2014–15, 2019–20
UEFA Europa League runner-up: 2011–12

Alavés
Copa del Rey runner-up: 2016–17

References

External links

Biography at La pizarra de Luis 

1989 births
Living people
Spanish footballers
Footballers from Bilbao
Association football wingers
Association football forwards
La Liga players
Segunda División B players
Primera Federación players
Divisiones Regionales de Fútbol players
Santutxu FC players
Sestao River footballers
Bilbao Athletic footballers
Athletic Bilbao footballers
Deportivo Alavés players
Deportivo de La Coruña players
Foolad FC players
Basque Country international footballers
Spanish expatriate footballers
Expatriate footballers in Iran
Spanish expatriate sportspeople in Iran